Orthotylus pusillus is a species of bug in the Miridae family that is can be found in Greece, Spain, and on the island of Sicily. It is also found in tropical region of Africa.

References

Insects described in 1883
Hemiptera of Europe
pusillus